Pyramid is an album by jazz saxophonist Cannonball Adderley recorded at Fantasy Studios in Berkeley, California in 1974 featuring performances by Adderley's Quintet with Nat Adderley, Hal Galper, Walter Booker and Roy McCurdy with guest appearances by Phil Upchurch, George Duke, and Jimmy Jones.

Reception
The Allmusic review by Scott Yanow awarded the album 3 stars and states: "Cannonball Adderley is in generally good form on this 1974 recording.... Nothing too earthshattering occurs but this is an improvement over many of Adderley's Capitol recordings." The Penguin Guide to Jazz awarded the album 2½ stars.

Track listing
All compositions by Julian "Cannonball" Adderley except as indicated
 "Phases" (Hal Galper) - 6:00  
 "My Lady Blue" (Galper) - 4:45  
 "Book-Ends" (David Axelrod) - 5:35  
 "Pyramid" - 3:40  
 "Suite Cannon: The King and I" - 3:13  
 "Suite Cannon: Time In" - 4:33  
 "Suite Cannon: For Melvin Lastie" - 2:36  
 "Oh Bess, Oh Where's My Bess?" (George Gershwin, Ira Gershwin) - 3:36  
Recorded at Fantasy Studios in Berkeley, CA, in 1974

Personnel
Cannonball Adderley - alto saxophone 
Nat Adderley - cornet
Hal Galper - electric piano
Walter Booker - bass
Roy McCurdy - drums
Phil Upchurch - guitar
George Duke - clavinet, ARP synthesizer
Jimmy Jones - piano (track 8)

References

1974 albums
Fantasy Records albums
Cannonball Adderley albums
Nat Adderley albums
Albums produced by Orrin Keepnews